Li Xirui (born 30 January 1990) is a Chinese actress and singer.

Career
Li made her acting debut in the romance comedy series Waking Love Up in 2011. She then played one of the lead roles in the romance web drama V Love produced by Jiaxing Media, and played significant supporting roles in the family drama The Wife's Secret and period romance drama Legend of Fragrance. Li rose to fame for her role as Wu Jiayi in the hit modern drama The Interpreter, and subsequently gained increased recognition for her role as Xia Qiao in the romance comedy drama Pretty Li Huizhen. 

Li played her first lead role in the romance comedy web drama Pretty Man in 2018. The same year, she played lead roles in the romance melodrama To Love To Heal, and suspense drama Dongshan Fine After Queen Consort the Snow.

Filmography

Film

Television series

Discography

Album

Singles

Awards and nominations

References

21st-century Chinese actresses
Living people
Actresses from Beijing
Singers from Beijing
1989 births
Chinese television actresses
21st-century Chinese women singers